

The Physical Properties of Greenhouse Gases

Greenhouse gases